Lieutenant-Colonel Sir Francis Vivian Dunn  (24 December 1908 – 3 April 1995) was a British conductor who was Director of Music of the Portsmouth Division of the Royal Marines from 1931 to 1953 and Principal Director of Music of the Royal Marines from 1953 to 1968. He was the first British Armed Forces musician to be knighted.

Early life
Francis Vivian Dunn was born in Jabalpur, India. His father, William James Dunn, was bandmaster of the Second Battalion King's Royal Rifle Corps and later director of music of the Royal Horse Guards. Dunn studied piano with his mother, Beatrice Maud, and undertook choral studies in Winchester. He attended the Hochschule für Musik Köln in 1923 and, two years later, the Royal Academy of Music. He studied conducting with Henry Wood and composition with Walton O'Donnell. As a violinist, he performed in the Queen's Hall Promenade Orchestra (under Wood), and in 1930 was a founding member of the BBC Symphony Orchestra (under several conductors).

Career
Dunn was released from his contract with the BBC and on 3 September 1931 commissioned as a lieutenant in the Royal Marines to be director of music for the Portsmouth Division of the Corps. His duties included directing the Royal Marines Band on the Royal Yacht, where he encountered the Royal Family. Princess Margaret later recalled that Dunn was her childhood hero.

Dunn participated in the royal tour of South Africa on board  in 1947 and a Royal Marines band tour of the United States and Canada in 1949. His promotion to lieutenant-colonel and principal director of music of the Royal Marines followed in 1953. Upon its completion, the Queen appointed Dunn CVO, and in 1960 OBE.

In 1955, Dunn was asked by Euan Lloyd of Warwick Films to compose the theme music for The Cockleshell Heroes (which was otherwise scored by John Addison). He appears as himself, conducting the Royal Marines, in the end titles of the 1966 film Thunderbirds Are Go. For the latter, a cherry picker was used for filming, and Dunn insisted on being on the crane itself. But every time he started, the camera rocked. And as Dunn got more excited with the music, the camera rocked more and more to the point where the crew thought they were going to come off the crane, hence director David Lane had to ask Dunn if he could conduct from the floor instead.

Upon retiring from the military in December 1968, Dunn became a guest conductor with the City of Birmingham Symphony Orchestra. He also recorded with the Light Music Society Orchestra. In 1969, he received an EMI Golden Disc for sales of more than one million Royal Marines Band records. In the same year, he was also elected an honorary member of the American Bandmasters Association. In 1987, he received the Sudler Medal of the Order of Merit from the John Philip Sousa Foundation. He became the Founder President of the International Military Music Society in 1976, a position which he held until his death. In 1988, after serving as the Senior Warden, Dunn became the first military musician to be installed as the Master of the Worshipful Company of Musicians.

Compositions
Dunn composed and arranged over 60 pieces of music. Several are marches, many with connections to the Royal Marines. These include The Globe and Laurel (1935, revised 1945), The Captain General (1949), Cockleshell Heroes (1955) and Mountbatten March (1972). He arranged many others, including Russian Preobrajensky March (author unknown); later to become the official slow march of the Royal Marines) and A Life on the Ocean Wave (the official quick march).

Personal life
Dunn married Margery 'Mike' Halliday in 1938. They had one son (Patrick) and two daughters (Leonie and Rosemary). He died of lung cancer in Haywards Heath, Sussex on 3 April 1995, aged 86. He is buried at Cemetery Chapel, Great Walstead, East Sussex. A memorial service was held at St Martin-in-the-Fields in London on Friday, 7 July 1995. Margery, Lady Dunn, died on 26 June 1998.

Recording
"The Martial Music of Sir Vivian Dunn". The Band of Her Majesty's Royal Marines, Plymouth, Captain J. R. Perkins. Clovelly CL CD10394, recorded 1994.

References

Oakley, Derek. Fiddler on the March: A Biography of Lieutenant Colonel Sir Vivian Dunn. London: Royal Marines Historical Society, 2000.
Rehrig, William H. The Heritage Encyclopedia of Band Music. Waterville, Ohio: Integrity Press, 1991 and 1996.
Richards, Jeffrey. Imperialism and Music: Britain 1876-1953. Manchester University Press, 2001.
Trendell, John.  "Obituary: Lt-Col Sir Vivian Dunn", The Independent, 18 April 1995.

1908 births
1995 deaths
20th-century English musicians
Alumni of the Royal Academy of Music
BBC people
British male conductors (music)
British male pianists
British military musicians
British people in colonial India
Composers awarded knighthoods
Conductors (music) awarded knighthoods
Deaths from lung cancer in England
English composers
English conductors (music)
English pianists
English violinists
British male violinists
Hochschule für Musik und Tanz Köln alumni
Knights Commander of the Royal Victorian Order
Military music composers
Musicians awarded knighthoods
Officers of the Order of the British Empire
People from Jabalpur
Royal Marines Band Service
Royal Marines officers
20th-century British conductors (music)
20th-century violinists
20th-century British pianists
20th-century British composers
20th-century British male musicians